Ralf Robinson (28 June 1885 – 23 August 1917) was an English cricketer. He was a wicket-keeper who played first-class cricket for Essex.

Robinson made four first-class appearances during the 1912 season, his debut coming in an innings defeat against Northamptonshire. Robinson's following games came during the next three weeks, scoring a career-best 11 not out during his final game.

Robinson, a second lieutenant during the First World War, died in Ypres at the age of 32.

External links
Ralf Robinson at CricketArchive 

1885 births
1917 deaths
English cricketers
Essex cricketers
British military personnel killed in World War I